The Two Brothers Rocks–Dudley Road Historic District encompasses a historically significant rural area of Bedford and Billerica, Massachusetts. It also includes a significant amount of conservation land, including local, state, and federal lands. The federal lands of the Great Meadows National Wildlife Refuge which line the banks of the Concord River, include the "Two Brothers Rocks", which were used to mark a land boundary between grants given to early Massachusetts Bay Colony governors  John Winthrop and Thomas Dudley, and which featured as boundary markers into the 20th century.

The two large rocks were inscribed with the year 1638 and the names Dudley and Winthrop by a descendant of Dudley's named Dudley Leavitt Pickman, as noted in the Bedford Town Report in 1889.

The district was listed on the National Register of Historic Places in 2010.  The Two Brothers Rocks are accessible either via watercraft on the Concord River, or by trails through Bedford's Altmann Conservation Area.

See also
National Register of Historic Places listings in Middlesex County, Massachusetts

References

Historic districts in Middlesex County, Massachusetts
Bedford, Massachusetts
Billerica, Massachusetts
National Register of Historic Places in Middlesex County, Massachusetts
Historic districts on the National Register of Historic Places in Massachusetts